Rodrigo Alves de Holanda Santos (born 4 June 2002) is a Brazilian footballer who plays as a defensive midfielder for Vasco da Gama.

Club career
Born in Barra de São Miguel, Alagoas, Rodrigo hails from a family of footballers, with his brother, Jean, and a number of cousins pursuing careers in the sport. He started his own career with local sides Projeto Barrinha and Sport Club Agrimaq, the latter of which had a partnership with professional club Vasco da Gama. Having briefly attended a school in Maceió on a scholarship, he joined Vasco da Gama at the age of thirteen.

In his first start for the club, in a 5–0 Campeonato Carioca win over Resende, he impressed with his performance in midfield, having been played out of position as right-back in previous games.

Career statistics

Club

References

2002 births
Living people
Sportspeople from Alagoas
Brazilian footballers
Association football midfielders
CR Vasco da Gama players